The Karakum Desert, also spelled Kara-Kum and Gara-Gum, is a desert in Central Asia. Its name in Turkic languages means "black sand": "" means sand; "" is a contraction of : "dark" or may pre-date that (be a derivation from a likely broader meaning which the word for black bore) in this language family. This refers to the shale-rich sand generally beneath the sand of much of the desert. It occupies about 70 percent, of Turkmenistan.

The population is sparse, with an average of one person per .

Geography
The desert covers roughly seventy percent of Turkmenistan, a long east–west swath. It sits east of the Caspian Sea which has a steep east bank. It adjoins, to the north, the long delta feeding the South Aral Sea further north, another endorheic lake, about  higher than the Caspian Sea. The delta is that of the Amu Darya river to the northeast, demarcating the long border with the Kyzylkum Desert of Uzbekistan. The desert is divided into three regions, the elevated northern Trans-Unguz Karakum, the low-lying Central Karakum, and the southeastern Karakum, home to a chain of salt marshes. The sea has fluctuated over millennia, but its majority loss during the Soviet Union's existence coincided with great irrigation projects. The North Aral Sea was partly restored, but the South Aral Sea ebbed to a small-size stasis at its river mouth, which itself dried up by 2014, leaving only fragments of the former sea behind, such as Barsakelmes Lake. 

Within the north-west edge of the desert used to be a river. In the late Pleistocene, the Amu Darya used to flow beyond the Aral Basin to Sarykamysh Lake then to the Caspian Sea.  Sedimentation and floods during a pluvial period led to overflow to the Zeravshan River valley to the east. The two flows merged and formed or expanded Horezm Lake, which had been formed by the earlier Khvalinian period, and as it overflowed northwards it carved its link with the Aral Sea along the Akcha Dar'ya population corridor of that low, gentle valley (a remote community of Western Uzbekistan and north-east Turkmenistan).

Environment
The sands of the Aral Karakum are made of finely-dispersed evaporites and remnants of alkaline mineral deposits, washed into the basin from irrigated fields.

Wildlife
Wildlife in this area is not very diverse and includes insects such as ants, termites, ticks, spiders, dung beetles, and darkling beetles. Lizards, turtles, and snakes also live in the Karakum. Bird species include Alauda, desert sparrows, and other species, while rodents include jerboas and gophers. The tolai hare, goitered gazelle, and corsac fox are examples of mammal species in the Karakum Desert.

Geology

The Karakum Desert is home to the Darvaza gas crater. Also called the "Door to Hell" or the "Gates of Hell" by locals, it is a crater of natural gas that has been burning since 1971. The crater is a major tourist attraction, with hundreds of visitors arriving each year.

The area has significant oil and natural gas deposits.

Hydrography
To the south the Murghab and Tejen rivers flow out of the Hindu Kush mountains, flow west, and empty into the desert, providing water for irrigation.

The desert is crossed by the second-largest irrigation canal in the world, the Karakum Canal, which brings water from the Amu Darya to southern regions of the desert. Construction on the canal was started in 1954 and completed in 1958.

Archaeology
Within the Karakum are the Uly Balkan, a mountain range in which archaeologists have found human remains dating back to the Stone Age.

Economy and resources
The oases of Mary and Tejen are noted for cotton growing.

Transport
The desert is crossed by the Trans-Caspian Railway.

See also 
 Kyzylkum Desert
 List of deserts by area

Notes and references 
Footnotes

References

External links 

Gonur Depe site in the Karakum Desert
photos and about the Karakum Desert
TravelBlog Darvasa Craters: Entrance to Hell
 

Deserts of Central Asia
Deserts of Kazakhstan
Deserts of Turkmenistan
Deserts of Uzbekistan
Ergs